Tourism in Georgia is an increasingly important component of the country's economy. In 2015 it employed around 158,500 people, producing 6.7% of Georgia's GDP and providing US$1.94 billion of revenue. In 2019, the number of international arrivals reached a record high of 9.3 million people with foreign exchange income in the year's first three quarters amounting to over US$3 billion. The country plans to host 11 million visitors by 2025 with annual revenues reaching US$6.6 billion.

The expenditures of foreign visitors to Georgia have a significant effect on the balance of payments, and approximately 35.9% of Georgia’s goods and service export revenue comes from tourism. International tourists stay an average of 6.5 days.

The official body tasked with promoting tourism to Georgia is the Georgian National Tourism Administration (GNTA). In 2016, the GNTA participated in 21 international and domestic tourism fairs, conducted marketing campaigns on 16 target markets, and hosted 99 press and familiarization trips.

Accommodation 

As of August 2017, there were a total of 1,945 accommodation units registered in the GNTA database, with a total of 65,656 beds. The regions with the most beds were Tbilisi - 17,796 (27.1%) and Adjara - 12,126 (18.5%). The most prevalent form of accommodation is hotels (41,123 beds), followed by Family Hotels (11,374 beds). In 2017, 60 new hotels with a combined bed number of 3,894 were opened. From 2017 to 2019, 194 hotels are planned to open, with a total bed number of 21,216.

Hotel chains with operations in Georgia include:Marriott Hotels & Resorts, Le Méridien, Courtyard by Marriott, Mercure, Millennium Hotel, Hilton Hotels & Resorts, Holiday Inn, Sheraton Hotels and Resorts, and Radisson Hotels.

Batumi features several casinos that attract tourists from Turkey, where casino gambling is illegal.

Arrivals by country

The most common citizenships of international visitors arriving in 2015, 2016, 2017, 2018 and 2019:

Destinations and attractions

Winemaking
Georgia is one of the oldest wine regions in the world and winemaking is deeply ingrained in the culture of the country. The oldest archaeological remains related to grape seeds and winemaking dating back 8,000 years have been found at an archeological site at Gadachrili Gora, in Georgia, while today the country has over 500 varieties of grape.
As of 2019, Georgia has 20 appellations of origin of wines, they are: Tsinandali, Napareuli, Atenuri, Kindzmarauli, Akhasheni, Mukuzani, Khvanchkara, etc.

Ecotourism

41% of Georgia's territory is covered by forests, with 25% of Georgia's territory lying within protected national parks. Protected areas of Georgia offer various services including: boating tours, birdwatching, eco-educational tours, hiking, horse riding, biking, safari tours, sport fishing. Georgia is a home to about 5,601 species of animals, including 648 species of vertebrates (more than 1% of the species found worldwide) and many of these species are endemics.

In 2016, 310,477 foreign and 424,397 Georgian citizens visited the Protected Areas of Georgia. The most popular attractions were Prometheus Cave, Kazbegi National Park and Sataplia Managed Reserve.

Safety

A travel advisory was in place during and after the 2008 Russo-Georgian War. It had the severity level of "extreme danger", due to the risks associated with fallout from the war, including land mines.

Since then tourist safety has improved, and in 2017 the International Crime Index ranked Georgia as the 7th safest country out of the 125 in its index.

Practical information
Georgia uses the standard Europlug (220 V, 50 Hz), the international dialing prefix is +995, it uses the metric system, and its currency is the lari (GEL or ₾).

See also
 Visa policy of Georgia

Notes and references

External links

 Official Georgian government website on tourism, by the Department of Tourism and Resorts of Georgia
 Tourism Geoinformation Center: Tours across Georgia (in English)

 
Georgia
Georgia